The 2009–10 season was Klubi i Futbollit Tirana's 71st competitive season, 71st consecutive season in the Kategoria Superiore and 89th year in existence as a football club. Following the title win the previous season, KF Tirana added to their 22 titles to make it their record 23 title wins. As the club were the league winners they were Albania's only team to play in the Champions League which was against Norwegian side Stabæk IF.

Background

Kit
Supplier: Lotto Sport Italia
Sponsor: Halili S.h.pk

Other information

Players

Squad information

Pre-season friendlies

Ohrid, Macedonia
Tirana's president Refik Halili chose not to reveal where the club would be holding their re-season training camp ahead of the club's appearance in the 2009–10 UEFA Champions League until he named the manager and the players had signed new contracts at the club. The two possibilities were either Ohrid in Macedonia or southern Turkey. After winning the 2008–09 Albanian Superliga the players received a three-week break ahead of the new season. It was announced that the team would be traveling to Oher, Macedonia instead of Turkey for their pre-season training camp on June 24, 2009, this was announced before Halili had signed a new coach which was not expected. The club along with new coach Ilija Lončarević traveled to Ohrid in western Macedonia for their pre-season training on June 28, 2009, which was four days after previously expected, the club left Tirana at 16:15 local time. The squad along with the staff planned to stay in Macedonia for nine days and had planned to three friendlies against Macedonian sides during their stay there. The club planned to stay at the 'Mizo' hotel in Oher for the duration of their trip. The club's first game was planned in Oher against local side FK Karaorman of Struga, however due to heavy rainfall the match was called off, it was due to be staged at a small stadium close to where Tirana was training, however it was expected for the friendly to be staged the next day depending on the weather. Tirana played their first game of the pre-season against Albanian-Macedonian side KF Vllaznimi on July 1, 2009, this match gave a chance for new coach Lončarević to try out the squad for the very first time and to see the younger and fringe players of the side as well. The 1st
preseason game proved to be a success for the champions of Albania and the coach as Tirana won comfortably 6–0 against the Macedonian side. Besa Kavaje bound striker scored 2 goals, the captain Devis Mukaj netted once, as did Jetmir Sefa, Ergys Sorra and new signing Arbër Abilaliaj. Three days later the club faced their biggest test of the stay in Oher, FK Teteks. The match was played on July 4, 2009 and the scores ended 1–1 with both teams creating chances but neither able to in the end. Tirana then played local a Struga side who they beat 3–1 with mostly young players and also a Macedonian League selection team on July 6, 2009 who they beat comfortably 6–0, the second time they beat a team with this same scoreline after their first game against KF Vllaznimi. The goals came from doubles from both captain Devis Mukaj and midfielder Gjergji Muzaka and the rest came from Daniel Xhafa and Arbër Abilaliaj. The team and staff left Macedonia for Tirana on July 7, 2009 after they had finished their last dinner in Macedonia. The club had spent a week and a half in Macedonia and had played 4 friendlies against teams from different levels of football, this gave Lončarević the chance to see his players for the first time since taking on the job at Tirana and to witness some of his younger players. In total Tirana played 4 friendlies in Ohrid, winning 3 of them and drawing just one which was seen as a positive result out of Macedonia ahead of the club's Champions League games and the Albanian Supercup.

Total Games

Competitions

Albanian Supercup 

As 2008–09 Albanian Superliga champions Tirana kicked off the domestic 2009–10 season with the annual Albanian Supercup on August 16, 2009, where they played the 2008–09 Albanian Cup winners Flamurtari. The match was played at the Qemal Stafa Stadium  with only a few thousand fans showing up from the start of the game. Tirana were forced to play an unusual line-up due to injury to some of their main players like inspirational leader Devis Mukaj and goal-machine Migen Memelli. Tirana started the game with just Arbër Abilaliaj up front with youngster Blerti Hajdari playing just behind the striker. The fans providing the atmosphere inside the stadium as always were the 'Tirona Fanatics', another notable fan was former chairman of KF Tirana and the president of Albania, Bamir Topi who had taken up his normal place in the V.I.P section of the stadium. The match itself started very slowly with very few chances to shout about until the second half when Tirana whipped in a corner and after confusion in the box former Flamurtari player Arbër Abilaliaj managed to scramble the ball into the back of the net on the 72nd minute mark. This proved to be the only goal in the game.

Kategoria Superiore

League table

Results summary

Results by round

UEFA Champions League

Second qualifying round

Statistics

Squad statistics

References 

2009-10
Albanian football clubs 2009–10 season